Among those who were born in the London Borough of Harrow, or have dwelt within the borders of the modern borough are (alphabetical order, within category):

Notable residents

Academia and research

 Peter Ackroyd, Biblical scholar, brought up in Harrow
 Patrick Moore, astronomer, born in Pinner
 Malcolm Nokes MC, CENTO nuclear scientist, teacher and researcher in chemistry
 Keith Riglin, bishop, academic chaplain, brought up in and educated in Harrow
 Edward Skoyles, researcher and quantity surveyor, born in Harrow

Arts and entertainment
 Aiden Shaw, model, author and actor, born in Harrow
 Yama Buddha, rapper and writer, lived and died in Harrow
 Peter André, singer and entertainer, born in Harrow
 George Arthurs, songwriter and author, lived and died in Harrow 
 David Baddiel, lives in Hatch End
 Ronnie Barker, comedian, lived in Pinner before moving to Oxfordshire
 Ginger Baker, drummer of Cream, lived on Harrow on the Hill
 James Blunt, singer, educated at Harrow School
 Lord Byron, poet, educated at Harrow School (1801–1805)
 Todd Carty, actor and director, best known for his roles in Grange Hill and EastEnders, lived in South Harrow
 Rebecca Clarke, composer and violist, was born and grew up in Harrow. 
 Kenneth Connor, Carry On actor, lived in South Harrow  
 Brian Cookman, musician, artist and Tai-Chi expert
 Barry Cryer, comedy writer and author, lived in Pinner
 Benedict Cumberbatch, actor, educated at Harrow School
 Leslie Davenport, artist and teacher
 Alan Dedicoat, announcer of The National Lottery Draws, lives in Harrow
 Alan Donohoe, singer of The Rakes
 Ian Dury, musician, of Ian Dury and the Blockheads, born in Harrow Weald
 Loick Essien, singer
 Tom Fletcher, singer/guitarist with McFly, born in Harrow
 Carrie Hope Fletcher, actress, singer, author and Vlogger born in Harrow
 Michelle Gayle, actress and singer, lives in Harrow-on-the-Hill
 W. S. Gilbert of the Gilbert and Sullivan partnership, lived and died at Grim's Dyke in Harrow Weald
 Honey G, a finalist on the thirteenth series of The X Factor
 Blake Harrison, actor, lives in Stanmore
 Gavin Harrison, musician, drummer of Porcupine Tree and King Crimson
 Billy Idol, singer, born in Stanmore
 Gregory Isaacs, reggae singer, lived and died in Harrow Weald in later life
 Sir Elton John, musician, brought up in Pinner Hill Road
 David Jones, artist and poet, lived in Harrow in later life and died there
 Martin Kemp, part of Spandau Ballet, lived in Pinner whilst working on EastEnders
 Mark Lamarr, moved from Swindon to Harrow in his late teens
 Simon Le Bon, lead singer of Duran Duran, brought up in North Harrow 
 Robin Leach, Harrow born and raised American television personality, former entertainment reporter for Entertainment Tonight, and former host of the syndicated Lifestyles of the Rich and Famous program
 Matt Lucas, comedian, born in Stanmore
 Royston Maldoom, choreographer, born in Harrow
 Linsey Dawn McKenzie, glamour model
 Peter Melvin, architect
 Roger Moore, actor, known for his role as James Bond, lived in Gordon Avenue, Stanmore
 Kate Nash, singer and musician
 Dev Patel, actor, stars in Skins and Slumdog Millionaire
 Stuart Pearce, football hardman and current England national Under 21 manager, played for Wealdstone FC 1978-83
 Geoffrey Perkins, TV producer, attended Harrow County School and lived in Barn Crescent, Stanmore
 Courtney Pine, jazz musician
 Marco Pirroni, musician, guitarist for Adam and the Ants
 Nina Rajarani MBE, founder of Srishti Dance and winner of The Place Prize in 2006
 Johnny Robinson, finalist on the eighth series of The X Factor
 Pam St. Clement, actress who played Pat Evans in EastEnders, born in Harrow-on-the-Hill 
 Jay Sean, raised in North Harrow
 Jamie Stewart, musician and former bassist for The Cult
 David Suchet, actor, lived in Pinner
 Melissa Suffield, actress who played Lucy Beale in EastEnders
 Screaming Lord Sutch, musician and leader of The Monster Raving Loony Party, lived and died in Harrow
 Faye Tozer, singer from Steps, lived in Harrow 
 Dave Vanian, lead singer of The Damned
 Mike Vernon, record producer, Blues Breakers with Eric Clapton, born in Harrow
 John Wardley, concept designer and developer of theme parks, born in Harrow
 Molly Weir, Scottish comedy actress, lived in Pinner until her death
 Vivienne Westwood, Dame Vivienne Westwood, fashion designer largely responsible for bringing modern punk and new wave into the mainstream, moved to Harrow aged 17
 Barbara Windsor, known for roles in the Carry On films and Eastenders, lived in Stanmore
 Richard Wright, keyboard player and songwriter with Pink Floyd, early years in Hatch End
 Roger Glover, bassist with Deep Purple and musician Harvey Shield went to Harrow County School.
 Nikki Grahame, best known as a contestant at Big Brother, lived in Stanmore at the time of her death

Business and finance
 Agha Hasan Abedi, founder of BCCI, at one point the sixth largest bank in the world

Engineering and technology
 Gavin Fisher, engineer, former chief designer for the Williams F1 team

Journalism and the media
 George Alagiah, BBC newsreader and journalist, lives in Harrow Weald
 Clive Anderson, lawyer and chat show host, was schooled at then Harrow County Grammar School
 Mrs Beeton, first celebrity cook, lived on Uxbridge Road, Hatch End
 Joe Colquhoun, comics writer, Charley's War
 Daniel Finkelstein, comment Editor of the Times newspaper
 Bob Holness, television presenter, lived in Pinner
 Claire Rayner, journalist and agony aunt, lived at Harrow on the Hill
 Heath Robinson, cartoonist, lived in Pinner
 Kay Burley, Sky News presenter and journalist lives on Harrow on the Hill, near Harrow School

Literature
Lord Byron, poet
Anna Harriett Drury (1824–1912), novelist, poet and writer of boys' stories, was born here.
Michael Rosen, children's Laureate, 2007–2009, born in Harrow-on-the-Hill in 1946 and lived in Pinner from 1946 to 1962.

Military
 Douglas Arthur Davies, World War I flying ace with No. 150 Squadron RAF
 Charles Garforth, 15th Hussars,  VC, educated in Harrow
 Theodore Hardy, Army Chaplains' Department,  VC, educated in Hatch End
 Leefe Robinson, RFC, VC, buried in All Saints' Churchyard, Harrow Weald graveyard at Brockhurst Corner opposite a restaurant bearing his name

Politics and government
 Diane Abbott, politician, grew up in Harrow
 Winston Churchill, British Prime Minister, attended Harrow School beginning 1888
 Sir Oswald Mosley, local MP in the 1920s
 Jawaharlal Nehru, first Prime Minister of India, educated at Harrow School
 Horatia Nelson, illegitimate daughter of Lord Horiatio Nelson; lived, died and is buried in Pinner
 Marmaduke Pickthall, convert to Islam, notable for translating the Qur'an into English
 Michael Portillo, Defence Minister in Margaret Thatcher's cabinet, attended Harrow County Grammar School
 Merlyn Rees, Welsh politician, taught in Harrow Weald Grammar School and lived in Hatch End
 Lord Sutch, eccentric politician and musician, lived and died in South Harrow (see also Arts, above)

Sport
 Alexis Sánchez, lived in Stanmore
 Sir Roger Bannister, runner and neurologist
 Akaash Bhatia, boxer
 Syd Brown, Middlesex opening bat in County Championship winning team, educated at Headstone (Now Nower Hill High) School
 Byron Bubb, international footballer
 Ciaran Clark, Aston Villa FC defender
 Angus Fraser, England cricketer
 Ben Gill, professional footballer for Cheltenham Town F.C.
 Audley Harrison, boxer
 Vinnie Jones, footballer and actor, played for Wealdstone FC 1984-88
 David Kemp, professional footballer and manager for Stoke City F.C.
 Adrian Mariappa, Reading defender
 Malcolm Nokes MC, Olympic medallist, hammer; Commonwealth medallist, hammer, twice; Chairman of coaching committee of the AAA
 John-Joe O'Toole, Colchester United footballer
 Stuart Pearce, footballer, played for Wealdstone FC 1978-83
 Mark Ramprakash, cricketer, lived in Hatch End
 Anton Robinson, from Rayners Lane, footballer for Bournemouth FC
 Simisola Shittu (born 1999), British-born Canadian basketball player for Ironi Ness Ziona of the Israeli Basketball Premier League
 Marvin Sordell, footballer, plays for Football League Championship club Bolton Wanderers as a striker
 Theo Walcott, born in Stanmore
 Elliott Ward, A.F.C Bournemouth defender
 Bevis Mugabi, Motherwell FC defender

See also
 Harrovian (disambiguation)

References

Harrow